Katherine Houghton Beckett is a fictional character of the ABC crime series Castle. She is portrayed by Stana Katic.

History
Katherine Houghton Beckett was born to Jim and Johanna Beckett and was raised in Manhattan.

Her grandfather was an amateur magician and frequently brought her to the famous Drake's Magic Shop after school in her early teens, resulting in her fascination for the art. She is also a comic book fan, having bought her first when she was 14 and envisioning herself as Elektra if she had a choice of what character to be. She was also raised by her father to be a baseball fan.

Beckett went to Stuyvesant High School, a public school in New York City reserved for highly gifted students; in "Food to Die For", she becomes reacquainted with her old high school friend, Madison Queller, who stated they shared 9th grade French and expressed her surprise that "the biggest scofflaw at Stuy became a cop". She then studied pre-law at Stanford University, dreaming of becoming the first female Chief Justice of the Supreme Court, before transferring to New York University after her mother's death to pursue a career in law enforcement. Between her junior and senior year of college, she spent a semester studying in Kyiv, Ukraine.

Throughout the series, Beckett demonstrates functional knowledge of a broad range of general topics she has studied, to the point of having ready familiarity with and informed opinions on those topics, even in subjects she did not specialize in during her education or subsequent career, such as literature or economics.  Castle occasionally remarks that he finds her intelligent and educated and that his character of Nikki Heat was written to reflect these traits.

Her mother's murder
On January 9, 1999, when she was 19, her mother, Johanna, was stabbed to death while on her way to meet with Jim and Kate for dinner. The detective in charge of the investigation, Detective John Raglan, was apparently never able to find the killer and attributed her death to a random act of gang violence. Kate, though, believes that there was more to her mother's murder than a random killing, thinking that the investigating detectives ignored every evidence that could lead them to her mother's murderer. He was later killed while trying to tell Kate very important information.

Her father took Johanna's death hard and became an alcoholic. She was eventually able to help her father get through it. She since wears her mother's wedding ring as a necklace for "the life she lost" and her father's watch for "the life she saved".

Johanna's death inspired Kate to become a cop: to be a detective that actually looks for justice for the sake of the victims' families instead of 'pigeon-holing' crimes the way Detective Raglan did in her mother's case. She also wanted a position in the force where she could investigate her mother's death further.

Richard Castle's books and the fictional shows Nebula 9 and Temptation Lane also apparently had its share of helping Kate get through her mother's death.

Career
After graduating from college, Beckett enrolled in the New York City Police Academy.  Upon completion, she was sworn into the New York City Police Department and assigned to the 12th Precinct as a probationary patrol officer; her training officer was Mike Royce (Jason Beghe), who according to Beckett was "the only one who understood the obsession that drove her". His stories and influence in her life later led to her falling in love with him.

Beckett became the youngest woman on the force to be appointed Detective 3rd Grade (beating out her future captain, Victoria Gates (Penny Johnson Jerald), by six weeks).  By 2009, Beckett was the lead detective of the 12th Precinct's Detective Squad, specializing in murder investigations.  She worked with fellow detectives Javier Esposito (Jon Huertas) and Kevin Ryan (Seamus Dever) and medical examiner Lanie Parish (Tamala Jones) under Captain Roy Montgomery (Ruben Santiago-Hudson).  After Captain Montgomery was killed in action in 2011, his position was filled by Captain Gates.

In "Always", Beckett resigns from the NYPD after nearly losing her life trying to apprehend Cole Maddox, the sniper who shot her the previous year at Captain Montgomery's funeral.  Over the next few days, she learns that Maddox was working for Senator William H. Bracken (Jack Coleman), who was the ultimate mastermind behind her mother's murder.  She asks for her old job back, and because her resignation wasn't processed, Captain Gates allowed her to remain on the force after serving out the suspension she was assigned for disobeying orders.

In "The Human Factor", Beckett is headhunted by Jerry Stack, a special investigator for the Office of the United States Attorney General, who offers her a job in Washington, D.C. where she will work on the most challenging and sensitive cases in the country.  After talking it over with Castle, she decides to accept the job.  However, although Beckett made a positive impression on her colleagues for her investigative skills, she soon found herself unable to make the necessary moral compromises for her new role, jeopardizing a plan to infiltrate a major crime syndicate to protect a young woman who would have been forced to act as the mole.  As a result, Beckett was fired, leaving her briefly unemployed due to station budget cuts preventing Gates from simply re-hiring her. Despite this, Castle was able to get her job back after he helped to reunite a prominent politician with his long-lost daughter in "Number One Fan", the city official wanting to thank the team for their role in bringing his family together.

In 2015, Beckett took the Captain's exam, which she passed with flying colors.  She is also investigated as a possible candidate for the New York State Senate. Beckett ultimately turned down the chance to run for Senate and accepted the promotion to Captain, and was assigned to command the 12th Precinct after Gates was promoted to Deputy Chief and reassigned to One Police Plaza.

As seen in "Knockout" and "Veritas", Beckett is a recipient of the New York City Police Department Medal of Honor, the NYPD Unit Citation with a wreath, and the NYPD Longevity Service Bar with numeral "10".

Partnership with Castle

In the pilot episode, Beckett leads the investigation into the murder of Allison Tisdale, which is staged in the style of a death scene described in the Richard Castle novel Flowers For Your Grave, along with other murders based on Castle's fiction.

Beckett is forced to have Castle consult on the case, and though she tries to contain his access, he repeatedly violates police protocol. Although the killer is apparently caught when he leaves his fingerprints on a note he allegedly sent to Castle, Castle convinces Beckett to continue the investigation based on a hunch, the two discovering that the killer was actually Allison's brother, setting up a mentally ill client of his sister—a social worker—so that he could claim the majority of their father's estate due to his father suffering from terminal cancer. By the end of the pilot, Castle uses his friendship with the Mayor to get partnered with Beckett under the pretense of conducting research for a new series of novels starring a detective based on Beckett.  Toward the end of the fourth episode, Beckett's literary alter-ego is revealed to be named "Nikki Heat", much to Beckett's annoyance, who is described as "really smart, very savvy, haunting good looks, really good at her job. And kind of slutty."

Mother's murder 
During the pilot, Castle speculated that Beckett had joined the police force due to an unsolved trauma suffered by someone close to her, and Beckett implied that he was correct. Castle also confirmed that Beckett "does have a history with (an) unsolved crime" which inspires her to build "case[s] that would never fall apart in court". In the second episode, Beckett plied suspect Chloe Richardson by admitting that someone close to her had been killed. By the fifth episode, Beckett tells Castle that it had been her mother, Johanna Beckett, a New York civil rights attorney, who had been violently murdered, and that Beckett became a cop because she wanted to be a detective who did not commit what she felt was the investigating detective's mistake of "pigeon-holing" crimes (she explained to Castle that she believes that her mother's killer was never caught because the investigating detectives simply assumed that she was killed in a botched robbery and ignored all evidence to the contrary, such as the fact that her mother still had her purse and keys when she was found). She explained that she now wears her mother's wedding ring on a necklace for "the life [she] lost" and her father's watch for "the life [she] saved" when she helped him recover from his alcoholism. She also reads mystery fiction as a result, hoping to gain insight into murderers' motives, and is not so secretly one of Castle's fans, although her main strength as a detective lies in her ability to empathize with the relatives of violent crimes, which she does "better than anyone [Montgomery] knows". Castle got the case file from Esposito.

In "Little Girl Lost", Beckett's past is further revealed when a former love interest, FBI Agent Will Sorenson, returns to New York and requests Beckett's assistance on a kidnapping case. It is revealed in the episode by Sorenson that Beckett once waited in line for an hour just to get one of Castle's books signed, and also how his novels helped her through her mother's death. In the first-season finale, Beckett angrily refuses Castle's help in reopening her mother's murder investigation—having concluded after conducting her own investigations after joining the force that focusing on her mother's death would destroy her life—stating that if Castle interferes, it will end his police collaboration with her.  Despite this, Castle confronts Beckett at the end of the episode with evidence that her mother was targeted for murder. At the beginning of season 2 she forgives Castle for his indiscretion about her mother's murder after he delivers a heartfelt apology. During this period it was also revealed that Beckett speaks Russian after a semester in Kyiv between her junior and senior year, as well as spending a brief period modeling when she was seventeen on the grounds that it seemed easier than waitressing (although the only shown photograph of her modeling period is her in tennis gear). Her partnership with Castle is later extended after Castle receives a three-book publishing deal after the success of the debut Nikki Heat novel.

Beckett's mother's case is again brought up at "Sucker Punch" when Lanie contacts a specialist, Dr. Murray, after realizing the wound similarities between the victim and Beckett's mother. Dr. Murray then reveals to Beckett that there is no doubt in his mind, that the victim is killed by the same man that murdered her mother. At first she is informed by a corrupt philanthropist Dick Coonan that it is a contract killer named "Rathborne" that killed her mother and the four other victims. They then set up an exchange—Castle actually donating $100,000 of his own money to cover the fee to fake a hit—so Beckett can finally catch the killer but he never shows. After the exchange goes bust she realizes that Coonan himself is the killer—given that he implied awareness of her connection to "Rathborne" without Beckett having made any reference to her mother's death—and as she goes to arrest and confront him, he takes Castle hostage. Castle manages to free himself but Coonan comes charging after him, only to have Beckett shoot him in the chest, killing him instantly. Though she gains some closure for having dealt with the assailant that killed her mother, she still must figure out who ordered her mother's death. In the same episode, Castle states that he will stop shadowing her and feels guilty that Beckett had to kill in order to save his life. However, Beckett tells him to stay, admitting that she has grown accustomed to Castle "pulling on [her] pigtails"—although she threatens to shoot him if he mentions that to anyone else—that he makes her hard job more fun, and that she wants him to be there when she finally finds whoever ordered her mother's murder.

Beckett's training officer after leaving the academy was Mike Royce; who according to Beckett was "the only one who understood the obsession that drove [her]". One of their cases involved a karaoke bar; another involved a monkey. While she tells Royce that she was in love with him, she later reveals that she was lying by saying it in order to keep him talking on the phone long enough to get a trace. However, after telling Castle that she lied about loving Royce, she walks off with tears clearly visible in her eyes.

In the episode "Knockdown" John Raglan, the detective who investigated  the case of Johanna Beckett's murder, contacts Beckett. Beckett and Castle meet with him and just as he is about to tell them something about the murder, he is shot by a sniper right before their eyes. The trace leads to Joe Pulgatti, a mob-boss in the 90's, who was imprisoned for the murder of the FBI agent Bobby Arman. Joe had always claimed to be innocent and told a story about cops who tried to kidnap him, but when Arman intervened the cops had him killed. Nobody believed him except Johanna Beckett, who was later killed in the same alley as Arman. Evidence leads to dirty cops Raglan and McCallister. McCallister had been Arman's partner at the time of his murder. Raglan and McCallister had been kidnapping and blackmailing mobsters until the incident with Arman. Ryan and Esposito traced down the shooter, a contract killer named Hal Lockwood who appeared out of the blue in 2004. The two detectives get kidnapped by him and are tortured until Castle and Beckett save them. Both Lockwood and McCallister were arrested. In the course of this investigation Beckett reveals her home-made murder board for the case to Castle, which she built the summer before.

In the season three finale "Knockout" Lockwood kills McCallister behind bars and breaks free at his official hearing at court. From now on he is hunting down Beckett. It is revealed that there was a third cop involved in the murder of Arman—Beckett's current captain, Roy Montgomery. He admits he shot Arman, but also tells her that he has all the necessary evidence to bring the so-called dragon down. He confesses everything to Beckett and sacrifices himself for her. His last act before dying is killing Lockwood. At his funeral Beckett gets shot by another unknown sniper. While she is lying on the ground Castle finally confesses his love for her.

In the season four premiere "Rise" Beckett barely survives the assassination attempt on her and takes three months off to recuperate. In this time Castle, Ryan and Esposito were tracking the money of Montgomery, Raglan and McCallister, but the evidence was destroyed in a fire in 1998. Beckett doesn't want to believe this, and only after Castle has a long talk to her does Beckett decide to see her therapist again. Castle only talked so seriously to her about this because of a call he received  from a "mysterious man", who claimed to be an old friend of Montgomery and in possession of the evidence against the dragon and is now blackmailing him in order to keep Beckett safe.

Later in the fourth season, in the episode "Dial M for Mayor" the case surfaces again, but only Castle realizes this thanks to the "mysterious man", who informs him that the dragon wants to blame Castle's old friend the mayor with the murder of a young woman in order to get rid of the mayor and Castle. Without Castle there would be nobody who could keep Beckett from investigating her mother's case and as soon she does this, the deal between the "mysterious man" and the "dragon" is over and Beckett would no longer be safe. The "mysterious man" arranges for another man (who looks guilty) to take the fall, but if he is really the murderer is not completely clear.

In the season four finale "Always", Cole Maddox, the man who shot Beckett in the season three finale, returns and tries to find the "mysterious man" who is blackmailing his employer (the "dragon"). Castle tries to talk Beckett out of everything, but as soon he reveals the existence of his mysterious informant Beckett breaks off her partnership with him. Castle is more willing to go than ever before, but he just can't let Beckett throw her life away again. Beckett and Esposito trace down Maddox alone, who defeats both of them and leaves Beckett hanging on the edge of a tall building. In this moment she realizes that Castle is more important to her than justice for her mother. After Gates suspends her and Esposito, she quits and goes directly to Castle. While the two are spending their first night together, Maddox visits the "mysterious man" and threatens him.

In the season five premiere "After the Storm", Castle, Beckett and Ryan manage to trace down the "mysterious man" – Michael Smith, an old friend of Montgomery. When Beckett and Castle find him he is in a very bad shape: Maddox had tortured him to learn where the files are. One of them is burned in Smith's fireplace, another one is hidden in an old storage building. Castle and Beckett head there, but Maddox was waiting for them. Esposito turns up and frees the two out of their hostage situation. Meanwhile, Maddox tries to open the safe with the files, but he is killed by a booby trap and the file is destroyed. The team attempt to reconstruct the files and discover an account number of U.S. Senator (and former New York assistant district attorney) William Bracken, revealing that he is the "dragon". After they are told Smith is out of surgery, Beckett and Castle go to see him, but he refuses to help them. He is then murdered by one of Bracken's men, though it is made to look like a heart attack. Beckett goes to Bracken and threatens him with the bluff that she has a third copy of the files, and that she is going to publish them if he goes near her or somebody she cares about.

This détente continues until season six's penultimate episode "Veritas", when Senator Bracken realizes that Beckett was bluffing and attempts to frame her for murder of his own associate, drug lord Vulcan Simmons. Beckett had recently discovered that Bracken was using Vulcan's drug money to prepare a run for the presidency. Bracken captures her, actually berates her for not appreciating that ordering her mother's death eventually made Beckett the good cop she is today, then leaves his thugs to kill her. She escapes by killing the thugs. Mr. Smith returns, having staged his death in season five to escape Bracken's attention. Smith reveals that there may be a tape recording of Bracken admitting to murder. Beckett remembers how, years earlier, Captain Montgomery gave her advice to search for clues in her mother's appointment book and tape recordings.  Castle helps her deduce where the tape is, and it reveals (then Assistant D.A.) Bracken was blackmailing Montgomery and his friends for their mobster extortion scheme and their killing of FBI agent Arman, admits that he wrongly convicted Pulgatti for the killing, and states that he will have Pulgatti's "bitch lawyer Johanna Beckett" killed if she keeps poking around, admitting that he has had other people killed. Montgomery has reached from beyond the grave to help his detective close the case.  Beckett is in tears when she finally arrests Bracken "for conspiracy, fraud, and the murder of my mother" during a live televised interview, in his Senate Office, as he announces his plans to run for the presidency.

In season eight, Beckett, now the Captain of the 12th Precinct, discovers that Bracken had a partner, a dirty CIA analyst known only as Loksat. Loksat had funded Bracken and Vulcan Simmons and used his connections to run their drug trade. Loksat has Bracken murdered in prison and attempts to have Beckett assassinated, but his men fall into a trap and are captured. The assassins are connected to Assistant Attorney General Allison Hyde who Loksat compels to commit suicide as a patsy. Beckett once again becomes consumed with her obsession, ending her relationship with Castle to protect him and relentlessly hunting for Loksat with the help of hacker Vikram Singh. Eventually, Beckett repairs her relationship with Castle who discovers that when he went missing, Castle had his own memories erased in order to protect Beckett after learning about Loksat. Loksat, revealed to be a man named Mason Wood, attempts to have Castle, Beckett and everyone else who knows about him killed in order to protect his identity. However, Castle and Beckett are able to subdue and capture Mason and expose him. The next morning, the two are ambushed and severely wounded by Caleb Brown, a public defender who had helped Mason set them up and then faked his death. Beckett kills Caleb and she and Castle survive the shooting which brings a final end to both Loksat and the conspiracy surrounding the murder of Johanna Beckett.

Personal life
In "Under the Gun", Beckett tells Castle that she has a '94 Harley softail motorbike, which she worked through high school to pay for. When he asks why she will not show him a picture of the bike, she says it is because she does not think he could handle the sight of her "straddling it in tight black leather".

In "Last Call", Beckett revealed that she has a tattoo. She also displayed her singing talents with the rest of her team.

In the Season 5 episode "The Final Frontier", Castle finds out that Beckett was (and possibly still is) a huge fan of a short-lived sci-fi series called Nebula 9, so much so that she was part of a Nebula 9 fan-gang in college. Later a picture even shows her dressed up like her favorite character.

In "Heroes & Villains", she is shown to be a client of a famous comic book store, and that she has bought a copy of the graphic novel based on Castle's character Derrick Storm, which she tries to hide as an attempt to help with the sales. When she interrogates Officer Hastings, who has been fighting crime as a vigilante called Lone Vengeance and is suspected of killing a man that knew her double identity, it turns out that the two of them are very similar in that they lost one of their parents when someone murdered them and have allowed that to drive their careers towards the police force in order to make justice. It also turns out that she has a boyfriend who works as a journalist and writes a comic about what Lone Vengeance does. Beckett tells her to stop letting her past define her life. When it is found that Officer Hastings is innocent, the officer and the journalist leave the precinct and kiss passionately as the lift door closes. Castle comments on the similarity between the couple the officer and the journalist make and the relationship between himself and Beckett.

In the season three finale "Knockout", after Beckett has been shot by a sniper, Castle tells her that he loves her. In season four premiere "Rise", Beckett says she does not remember anything about her shooting (implying that she didn't hear Castle's declaration) but it is later discovered that she remembers everything that happened that day. During Season 4, Castle discovers that Beckett does remember him saying that he loved her but she can't be honest about her feelings. In later conversations with her therapist and friend Lanie, Beckett is reminded that Castle may not wait for her to return his feelings and she'll be faced with the fact that he's moved on. During the season finale "Always", however, Castle restates to Beckett that he loves her and although they immediately break up their partnership, at the end of the episode, they finally kiss. During Season 5, their romantic relationship continues to be explored. At the end of season five Castle proposes to Beckett, and in the sixth-season premiere she accepts his proposal and in the season 7 episode "Time Of Our Lives", they get married.

Relationships

Richard Castle
Beckett's relationship with Castle is strained from the start as she finds him to be annoying and reckless. However, she warms up to him after seeing how useful he is on cases, which he often solves by noticing things that no one else did. The two also begin to develop a strong friendship and to care deeply for each other.

In "Flowers for Your Grave", Castle gives Beckett a brief kiss on the cheek when he gives her an early release copy of his last Derek Storm novel. At one point, Beckett challenges Castle to guess why she is a cop instead of a more stereotypical profession. Guessing that she came from upper middle class, that she lost someone close to her, and that the killer was never caught. Seeing her watch him peg her closer and closer until he finishes, she is obviously bothered by his accuracy. Then, at the end of the episode, he asks her out and when she says no, he says, "It would have been great". She replies, "You have no idea."

In "Nanny McDead", Castle and Beckett are talking about Castle's marriages and Beckett says she's more of a "one and done" kind of girl instead of Castle's two divorces that have already occurred.

In "Hedge Fund Homeboys", for the first time, Beckett starts to soften up for Castle by joking with him about all the schools that he was kicked out of and now that he's become famous, they all claim him as an alumnus. Additionally, Beckett is starting to be able to 'read' Castle to know some of his 'looks'.

In "A Chill Goes Through Her Veins", Beckett first reveals to Castle that it was her mother that was murdered when she was 19 years old and how it happened.

In "Sucker Punch", Castle offers to pay $100,000 of his own money to set up a fake contract with the man who murdered her mother. However, they soon realize that they have been tricked and that the actual killer was someone to whom they had just granted immunity in exchange for the identity of the "real" killer. Castle is taken hostage at gunpoint and Beckett is forced to shoot and kill the suspect before she can find out who hired him to kill her mother. Castle, feeling guilty that she lost her only lead to save his life, decides to end their partnership, but Beckett asks him to stay because, when she finally learns who ordered the hit on her mother, she wants him there with her.

In "The Third Man", Castle observes that being excited about a man is unusual behavior for Beckett when he notices her playing with her hair while organizing a date with a fire fighter Lanie sets her up with. At the end of the episode, Castle and Beckett go to get burgers together as they discuss their boredom on their respective dates. As they walk out the precinct arm-in-arm, Beckett unconsciously plays with her hair, implying that she is interested in Castle. Further, Beckett only asked Lanie to set her up once Castle revealed he had a date.

In "Tick Tick Tick...", she is shown to be jealous of Castle's attention to Agent Shaw and her high-tech equipment. When Beckett becomes the ultimate target of a serial killer who is obsessed with her being "Nikki Heat", she is almost killed after he blows up her apartment. In order to protect her, Castle allows her to stay with him in his apartment, where she makes him breakfast as a thank you.

In "Love Me Dead", Beckett's relationship with Castle is further demonstrated by Alexis, who looks up to her and sees her as a friend and surrogate mother at times, even (secretly) asking her advice on a foreign exchange program to France. In "Wrapped Up in Death", Castle asks Beckett to look out for Alexis if anything happens to him, which Beckett promises to do. In "Under the Gun", Beckett also dispenses parenting advice, telling Castle that Alexis is entering her "wild-child phase", and jokingly makes references to some rebellious things she did as a teenager, which Castle is very interested in hearing more about.

In "A Deadly Game", Beckett is on the brink of telling Castle about her feelings for him when his ex-wife (Gina) shows up to go to the Hamptons with him, saying he'll "See [Beckett] in the fall". They do not share any communication whatsoever during the summer.

In "Deadly Affair", Beckett and her team find Castle at a crime scene in the season three premiere and arrest him for murder (which she gladly does because he didn't call her to inform that he was back in town), but after he is proved innocent she sets him loose. Beckett (possibly) "loses" a bet with Castle regarding who would discover evidence leading to the next stage of their investigation first- although they both received the evidence simultaneously-, which then results in him being reinstated as her partner.

In "He's Dead, She's Dead", it is revealed that Beckett has looked at the biography page of Castle's official website, and thus knows his middle name is "Edgar". However, his real middle name is Alexander, Castle having legally changed his name from Richard Alexander Rodgers to Richard Edgar Castle (in tribute to Edgar Allan Poe) when he began writing. This could be relevant because the daughter of the murder victim foresaw that someone with the name Alexander will save her life one day.

In "Anatomy of a Murder" Castle is having a discussion with Martha near the end and she states: "Would you be willing to break her out of prison.? Because, that, my boy is True Love." Later, when Esposito and Castle are bantering about being stuck in jail and Esposito says that Castle would have to fend for himself, Beckett says: "Don't worry, Castle. I'd get you out."

In "3XK" Castle is tied to a chair in an apartment when Beckett smashes down the door to save him. She states, "I'm so glad you're okay!". Later, at the end of the episode, Castle talks about how awful he feels that he let the killer get away and Beckett tells him that she knows how it feels. She then puts her hand on his knee and he puts his on top of hers as they sit there.

In "Nikki Heat", Beckett becomes jealous of the actress Natalie Rhodes (Laura Prepon) (dressed as Nikki Heat, the character Castle based on Beckett) when she sees her kissing Castle in the elevator. Unbeknownst to Beckett, Castle turned Rhodes down, because he felt that she was only acting out a fantasy he created (noting later to Beckett that sleeping with a woman posing as a fictional version of her would be too "meta").

In "Knockdown", Castle and Beckett get involved in a strenuous kiss as a way to distract a guard, but afterwards, it is clearly seen by both their faces and Castle's first comment that they felt something more. Later, during the final gun battle with 'Lockwood', he has Beckett targeted and is just waiting for her to show her face for a head shot. Castle becomes aware of it, sneaks up behind 'Lockwood', and jumps him just as he's about to shoot Beckett. With gusto, Castle knocks him down, giving him 3 hard punches to his jaw, knocking him out. Beckett notes his bravery to save her and is there at the end to help gently bandage his hand.

In "Setup", Castle and Beckett can be seen in a concealed tarp together after being exposed to high levels of radiation. Castle asks Beckett about her recent trouble with Josh (her current boyfriend) and she responds by telling Castle about how Josh has been away a lot, and how she wants him to be there for her. Unfortunately, a man comes and interrupts before Castle can say something to Kate that could probably change their relationship.

In "Countdown", Castle and Beckett are locked inside a giant freezer after raiding the location where a bomb is believed to be held. Fearing that they are both going to die as no one knows where they are, they eventually huddle together to keep warm, but are both very weak from the cold. Beckett thanks Castle for being there with her and Castle replies that he always will be. Beckett touches his face and says "I just want you to know that I. ..." but passes out before she can finish. Castle tries to wake her up, but he soon passes out as well. However, they are soon rescued by Esposito and Ryan. After finding the bomb later on near the end of the episode, Castle and Beckett realize that it is too late for a bomb squad. Holding hands, they look into each other's eyes and then with less than a second left, Castle yanks all the wires out, miraculously defusing the bomb as the timer hits 0:00. Relieved, he and Beckett hug. At the end of the day, Castle walks to the elevator, leaving Beckett and Josh to themselves. As Beckett is hugging Josh, she looks on at Castle until he's in the elevator. Castle looks completely heartbroken at the fact that they faced certain death twice and yet, neither one of them expressed their true feelings.

In "The Dead Pool", she is "courted" by another writer, Castle's protégé, for information and characteristics. At the end of the episode, Castle admits openly to being jealous, and she turns the writer down, calling herself a "one writer girl". When Castle thanks her, she replies "always".

In "Knockout", Beckett tells Castle he and she are "over" after his unsuccessful attempt to dissuade her from continuing her obsessive pursuit of Hal Lockwood, an assassin connected to her mother's murder. While they fight Castle tells Beckett that he doesn't understand what their relationship is; that they "nearly died frozen in each other's arms", kissed, held hands, and spend their free time together, but they never talk about any of it. He also accuses her of "hiding" in relationships with men she doesn't love. While delivering a eulogy at Montgomery's funeral, Castle sees in the distance the sun reflecting off what he realizes to be a sniper rifle that is aimed at Beckett. Before he can tackle her out of the way, Beckett is shot in the chest. As she's lying on the ground, Castle begs her to stay with him and says "I love you, Kate" before she passes out.

The season four premiere ("Rise") opens with Beckett surviving her injury after undergoing extensive surgery and even flat lining. When Castle visits her, she claims to have lost all memory of what happened and asks him to give her some time to process everything. She takes three months to recover, but doesn't call Castle during that time, in a mirror situation to that of the previous year, when Castle didn't call Beckett for the whole summer. When she comes back to work, she meets her new boss, former Internal Affairs member Victoria Gates, with whom she immediately has a confrontation after she learns that the investigation into the attack on her, as well as Montgomery's death, has been closed. She also learns that, while she was away, Ryan, Esposito and Castle got some information, and that a storage facility possibly holding important information burned down, apparently in an accident. She meets with Castle – who has left the precinct since Beckett isn't there – and tells him that she broke up with Josh during the summer, and that she feels that she can't have an actual relationship while the people that had her mother killed are still free. She attempts to continue the investigation of her mother's death, but Castle convinces her to try to give it some time, so that things may become clearer.

Beckett later confesses to her psychologist that she remembers everything upon getting shot, including Castle confessing his feelings for her, but does not admit this to anyone else. She refuses to pursue any relationship (including with Castle), until the man behind her mother and Roy Montgomery's deaths has been caught.  In "Eye of the Beholder", Beckett is upset when Castle becomes interested in another woman, Serena Kaye, but refuses to acknowledge her feelings towards Castle, leading her psychologist to question whether she's worried that he will wait or that he will not.

Castle becomes worried about Beckett when they are working on a sniper case ("Kill Shot"), and realizes that she is suffering from PTSD from her shooting. He begs Esposito, who also once suffered from PTSD, to help her overcome it. To do so, Esposito has her hold the rifle that shot her and tells her that she has to make what happened a strength instead of a weakness.  Later on, knowing that Castle was the one who talked Esposito into helping her, she thanks him.

In "47 Seconds", Martha encourages her son to tell Beckett how he feels; however, while Beckett is interrogating a suspect, she says "I was shot in the chest and I remember every second of it", not knowing that Castle is in the observation room and overhears it. Castle is stunned and hurt that Beckett has been lying to him the entire time about not remembering anything. He tells Martha that since she never said anything, he believes that it means she doesn't feel the same way. Although Martha believes that he should end his partnership now that he knows the truth, Castle decides to stay on the grounds that he wants to continue, as he wishes to feel he is doing something that matters.

In "The Limey", Beckett and Lanie talk about Castle, leading Beckett to admit her feelings for him. Her attempt to tell him about this (encouraged by Lanie) fails, though, as he appears with a flight attendant at the crime scene. Beckett is disappointed, but still refuses to talk to him about this.

In "Headhunters", Castle teams up with Detective Ethan Slaughter, clearly avoiding Beckett. She talks to her therapist about this and he suggests that maybe Castle is not ready to wait for her anymore. Beckett is devastated to hear this and is therefore happy when Castle ends his brief partnership with Slaughter.

In "Undead Again", the case Beckett and Castle are working on partly mirrors their own problems such as one witness claiming not to remember anything of a murder. In the end, Beckett tells Castle that she is seeing a therapist and is working on herself which causes the wall inside her to slowly come down. To this revelation, Castle says "I'd like to be there when it does" to which Beckett replies "Yeah, I'd like you to be there, too".

In the Season 4 finale, "Always", Beckett and Castle are forced to deal with their relationship when a murder they are investigating turns out to be linked to Beckett's shooting almost a year before. Castle, trying to get Beckett off the case, tells her he loves her and admits that he heard her saying she remembered everything. She is, however, angry that he hid important facts from her in order to protect her and refuses to back off from the case, causing Castle to end their partnership. Beckett is unable to resolve the case this time, though, and, in a near-death experience, realizes how much Castle means to her. After she resigns from her job, Beckett visits Castle, tells him she is sorry and when she almost died, all she could think about was him. After some hesitation on Castle's part, they kiss passionately and Beckett takes his hand and leads him to his bedroom to make love.

In the Season 5 premiere, "After the Storm", Beckett and Castle have consummated their relationship when Castle wakes up in his bed the next morning to find a semi-clothed Beckett walking into his bedroom with coffee. They speak about their night, with Beckett asking Castle if he liked it, to which Castle replies with a yes. They both agree that it was not a one time thing, but their conversation is interrupted when Castle's mother comes home, causing Castle to send Beckett to hide in his closet. Beckett then has to do a secretive "Walk of Shame" out of Castle's loft, so that Martha and Alexis don't see her. Castle then comes to visit her and she tells him it wasn't his finest hour and he says I'll make it up to you somehow and Beckett replies that they could go for a round 2.

In "Cloudy with a Chance of Murder", a suspect tells Castle and Beckett about the problems with secret romances and Beckett becomes concerned about having to lie to everyone about their relationship. To make things worse, a woman with the TV station invites Castle to dinner with her. Even worse, she goes to Castle's apartment to get it on with him and is only wearing her bikini beneath her clothes. Castle accidentally butt-dials Beckett and based on what she hears, she breaks into Castle's to find the girl on top of Castle with a bikini on.

In "Secret's Safe with Me", Martha reveals to Castle that she knows about Castle and Beckett. Castle then tells Alexis as well (off-camera). Near the end of the episode, Castle and Beckett share a romantic handshake "kiss".

In "Murder, He Wrote", Castle and Beckett decide to go to the Hamptons for a weekend. While they're there, they are about to go skinny-dipping in his pool and Beckett even fully drops her towel ... and then a nearly dead murder victim stumbles in, falling into the pool and drowns. Later in the episode, Ryan finds out about their relationship and keeps it from Esposito. Among other things, Castle speculates to Beckett that since Brad and Angelina are called "Brangelina", Castle thinks that they should be called "Caskett".

In "Probable Cause", Ryan tells Esposito about Castle and Beckett. Assumedly, Esposito tells Lanie off-camera also.

In "The Final Frontier", Beckett and Castle are called to a Sci-Fi convention to solve a case. Castle then discovers Kate loved the Sci-Fi TV Show Nebula 9.

In "Swan Song", During the video-taping of a documentary about an up-and-coming rock band, Castle briefly caresses Beckett's face and is caught on tape ... which might be fully reviewed by Capt Gates before it is released for publishing. In this episode we discover Kate hates cameras and she is very camera shy.

In "After Hours", Castle and Beckett have a dinner for their parents and themselves which goes VERY badly and only a call-away for a murder seems to save them from a dinner gone bad. This leaves them thinking that maybe they are too different for each other. Fortunately, events bring them back together and even their parents seem to have established a friendship.

In "Secret Santa", Beckett reveals to Castle that ever since her mom died, she and her dad don't celebrate Christmas anymore. However, at the end of the show, she relents and attends the Christmas dinner with Castle and his family when Castle says it is a good time to create new traditions. Esposito was supposed to be alone on Christmas Eve as his plans backfire, but he ends up spending Christmas Eve with a family which was part of the murder investigation.

In "Significant Others", Castle's first ex-wife Meredith stops by and moves in so that she can help take care of Alexis. This happens while Beckett is there and she is (secretly) hoping that Castle will say no. But, he says yes. This causes a lot of problems between them. Later in the episode, Meridith invites Kate to dinner. Castle is advised by Ryan and Esposito about how bad this can be for him. The girls really hit it off in their get-together and apparently, some secrets about Castle are revealed to Beckett. They leave on good terms, but Meredith tells Beckett that she finally left Castle because he was so unwilling to reveal inner secrets to her. This leaves Beckett wondering.

In "Reality Star Struck", Valentine's Day is coming up. Castle, in an attempt to surprise Beckett, puts a nice gift of a pair of beautiful earrings for her in her coat pocket, not realizing that it is actually Capt. Gate's coat pocket, – with a note from Castle to Beckett. Fortunately, the note only says, "You are Beauty Passion, and fierce Intellect. Be my valentine. Rick" and therefore, Beckett is not in trouble. At the end, it turns out that Beckett's gift for Castle is a drawer in her dresser just for him In her apartment, she then tells him to take off his clothes, place them in the drawer and to meet her in bed, to which Castle was very pleased about.

In "Target", Alexis and another girl are kidnapped and Castle assumes that Alexis was taken because she was at the wrong place at the wrong time. However, Beckett soon finds out that Alexis was the real target. When Castle goes to rescue her, Beckett fears for his life and when he returns home with Alexis, she tells Castle to never scare her like that again.

In "Scared to Death", at the end, when Castle and Beckett are toasting their success, she tells Castle that she knows this trick with ice cubes. This is probably referring back to the trick she was talking about near the beginning of episode "Poof! You're Dead". Plus, Castle's Bucket List indicates that his #1 is "Be with Kate". He says he put that on about 3 years ago. This also might link to that same older episode because during that episode, he officially breaks up with Gina.

In "The Lives of Others", Castle is at home with a broken kneecap and witnesses what appears to be a murder across the street at another apartment. Throughout the episode, he seems to be gathering more and more incriminating data, but Beckett, Esposito, and Ryan check on things at different times and cannot confirm what he saw. Ultimately, it turns out that it was a birthday present (he was born on April Fools' Day) and Beckett had her crew and Castle's family set up the entire thing on him in order to spring a surprise birthday party for him.

In the season 5 finale, "Watershed", Castle proposes to Beckett. She was shocked as she thought Castle was going to break up with her (after their fight the previous episode) and when Castle says they will make it work and they will be great she happily accepts in the season 6 premiere, "Valkyrie", and they try to make it work long distance (Beckett gets a job in Washington D.C.). However, in "Need to Know", Kate was fired after she tipped of the press, which helped an innocent Russian National escape from her crime ridden family and fumble the CIA's attempt at using her via blackmail. However, in the next episode, even without her badge, Captain Gates allows her to assist on the case and thanks to a connected politician, she was reinstated at the NYPD and was allowed to, once again, work with Castle so long as the two remained professional at work.

In season six, Kate and Castle often spend their downtime making wedding preparations.

In "Time of Our Lives", Kate and Castle finally get married in the presence of her father, his mother, and his daughter.  In "Once Upon a Time in the West", they visit an Arizona dude ranch as both a murder investigation and a honeymoon.

In "Hollander's Woods", Beckett finally learns what pushed Castle to be a mystery writer and supports him as he tries to finally find out what happened when he was 11. Despite this, she doubts him when he identifies a serial killer by voice as the incident happened over 30 years before. However, to make up for it, she finds the probable location of the killer's victims and promises to support Castle if he decides to break into a barn on the property even though it is illegal as she can't legally search it. When Castle is confronted by the killer, Beckett is left outside helpless, but manages to get him her gun, allowing Castle to kill the man and save himself. When Castle gets an award for his writing, he credits Beckett as his inspiration and dedicates it to her as well as his friends.

In season eight, with the discovery of Loksat and Beckett's obsession over her mother's murder resuming, she ends her romantic relationship with Castle in order to protect him. However, the two eventually make amends and get back together. In the series finale, in a flashforward of seven years, Castle and Beckett are shown to now have three children together and they are still happily married.

Will Sorenson
In "Little Girl Lost", FBI agent Will Sorenson (Bailey Chase) turned up and were found to be Beckett's ex-boyfriend who dated her for 6 months, but broke up with her when he decided to go to Boston for his career. He asked Beckett to go back to him in the episode, Beckett answered that she "would consider it", but it was not mentioned again.

In "Death In the Family", Sorenson was in the car driving former mobster Jimmy Moran back to the safe house when the killer pulled up next to them and shot both Moran and Sorenson. Beckett later looked genuinely concerned at the news of his injury and waited at the hospital with Sorenson until she had to leave for work purposes, returning at the closing of the case laughing and enjoying her conversation with her ex-boyfriend.

Tom Demming
In "Den of Thieves", Beckett meets robbery detective Tom Demming (Michael Trucco), to whom she instantly takes a liking. It is later revealed that the two have started dating, eating together at work, and even sharing a cab. At the end of "Overkill", she shares a kiss with him, confirming that they are now in a relationship. However, in the season 2 finale, Beckett breaks off the relationship, claiming that it "isn't what [she's] looking for right now". Demming asks her what she is looking for and she merely looks away.

Josh Davidson
In the last scene of "Punked", Josh (Victor Webster) comes to the precinct and picks Beckett up to go motorbike riding (shown by her going to get her helmet). Prior to this, Beckett had not told anyone that she had a new boyfriend. In the next episode it is revealed that Josh is a biker and a cardiac surgeon.

In "Last Call", Beckett tells Castle that she and Josh had just been tucked up in bed with her laptop when his call came through to meet him at "The Old Haunt".

In "Knockdown", Castle arrived at Beckett's apartment and asked for Josh before he handed her flowers.  Supposed this may suggest that Kate and Josh are possibly serious.

In "Countdown", Josh stays in Manhattan, as opposed to going to Haiti, causing Beckett to think they "have a chance". Josh saves both her and Castle from hypothermia. They embrace at the end of the episode, but Beckett seems distracted and longingly stares after Castle as he leaves.

In "Rise", Beckett reveals to Castle that, sometime during her shooting recovery, she broke up with Josh. She later explains to him that even though she really liked him, she can't be the person she wants to be in a relationship until she has full closure on her mother's murder.

Alternate universe
In Season 7 episode "Time of Our Lives", Castle is launched into an alternate universe where he and Beckett never met. In this world, Kate is the commander of the 12th Precinct, and is the youngest woman in NYPD history to make Captain. However, the job is not all that it is cracked up to be - there is much compromise and politics. She frequently dates, but none of them really go anywhere. She has not yet solved the murder of her mother. She remains a fan of Richard Castle's work, and she accepts an invitation to go for drinks with him in order to find out why he killed off Derrick Storm. She was the same person she was when they first met. 

When Castle is abducted, Captain Beckett finds him by either coincidence or fate and saves his life by killing his kidnappers. Castle quickly returns the favor when another gunman appears by taking the bullet to the chest, which returns him to his own reality.

Reception
For her portrayal of Kate Beckett, Stana Katic was nominated at the 2009 Satellite Awards for Best Actress in a Drama Series and won in 2012 the PRISM Award for Best Performance in a Drama Episode.

Beckett was listed in AfterEllen.com's Top 50 Favorite Female TV Characters. Radio Times included her in its list of the Ten Strong TV Women. She was included in TV Guides list of "TV's Sexiest Crime Fighters". Her relationship with Castle was recognized by two TV Guide Awards for "Favorite Couple Who Should" in 2011, and "Favorite Couple" in 2012.

References

External links

Castle (TV series)
Fictional characters from New York City
Television characters introduced in 2009
Fictional New York City Police Department detectives
Fictional government agents
Fictional New York City Police Department captains